Bernard Poole is an English former professional rugby league footballer who played in the 1950s.

Playing career

International honours
Bernard Poole won a cap for England while at Leeds in 1950 against France.

Challenge Cup Final appearances
Bernard Poole played left-, i.e. number 11, in Leeds' 9-7 victory over Barrow in the 1956–57 Challenge Cup Final during the 1956–57 season at Wembley Stadium, London on Saturday 11 May 1957, in front of a crowd of 76,318.

References

External links
 (archived by web.archive.org) Stats – Past Players – P
 (archived by web.archive.org) Statistics at hullfc.com

Living people
England national rugby league team players
English rugby league players
Hull F.C. players
Leeds Rhinos players
People from Hunslet
Rugby league players from Leeds
Rugby league second-rows
Year of birth missing (living people)
Yorkshire rugby league team players